Interbus is a bus company operating in the city of Xalapa, Mexico. The company operates two lines of buses in the city, the Green Line and the Yellow Line.

References

Bus companies of Mexico
Xalapa